Hideki Nagano (born 1968) is a Japanese classical pianist. He has been a member of the Ensemble intercontemporain since 1995 and lives in France.

Biography
Nagano was born in Nagoya. He studied at the University of Tokyo in particular with Henriette Puig-Roget.

He arrived Paris in 1988 without speaking much French, and prepared for the entrance exam to the Conservatoire de Paris. He studied piano with Jean-Claude Pennetier and vocal accompaniment with Anne Grappotte then with Jean Kœrner.

Recordings 
 Hideki Nagano plays Boulez — Messiaen — Murail — Dutilleux, Fontec, 1997
 Hideki Nagano plays Prokofiev — Messiaen — Murail, Nippon Columbia, 1998 
 George Antheil, La Femme 100 têtes — Sonatina — Jazz sonata , Pianovox, October 1998
 Tōru Takemitsu: Chamber music, BIS Records, November 1998
 Maurice Ravel, Piano works, Nippon Columbia, 2001
 Bechara El-Khoury, Waves, Op. 60, on the New York, Tears and Hope / The Rivers Engulfed records, Naxos Records, September 2006
 Jonathan Harvey: Bird concerto with pianosong, recorded at the Warsaw Autumn Festival on 19 September 2009, NMC Recordings, October 2011
 Pierre Boulez, Une page d'éphéméride, in Complete Works, Deutsche Grammophon, 2013

With the Modulations Trio 
 Bruno Mantovani, Da Roma, on the Art d'écho record, Sismal records, 2007

With the Ensemble intercontemporain 
 Philippe Manoury, La Partition du ciel et de l'enfer, Adès, 1997
 Pierre Boulez, Sur Incises, Deutsche Grammophon, 2000
 Pierre Boulez, Pli selon pli, Deutsche Grammophon, 2002
 Bruno Mantovani, Éclair de Lune, Kairos, 2008
 Pierre Jodlowski, Drones — Barbarismes, Kairos, 2011
 Yann Robin, Art of metal II, Kairos, 2012

References

External links 
 Nagano à propos du concerto pour piano de Ligeti on the site of the Ensemble intercontemporain
 review of his interpretation of the first piano sonata and the Une page d'éphéméride by Boulez on Seen and heard international (Salzburg, January 2009).
 review of his interpretation of the Harrison’s Clocks by Birtwistle on the site Seen and heard international (Aldeburgh Festival, June 2009).

1968 births
21st-century classical pianists
21st-century Japanese male musicians
Conservatoire de Paris alumni
Japanese classical pianists
Japanese male classical pianists
Living people
People from Nagoya